Amy Herdy is a film producer. She won a 2018 George Polk Award, for her Netflix documentary, “The Bleeding Edge”.

Life 
She was a crime reporter at The St. Petersburg Times, and The Denver Post.
She was an investigative producer at KUSA-TV.

From 2006 - 2010 she served as an instructor for the School of Journalism at the University of Colorado, Boulder

Herdy has served as a producer, researcher, and investigator on the documentaries The Hunting Ground (2015), The Bleeding Edge, (2018), On the Record (2020), and Allen v. Farrow (2021), all directed by Kirby Dick and Amy Ziering.

References

External links

Living people
Year of birth missing (living people)
American women journalists
21st-century American journalists
21st-century American women writers
The Denver Post people
George Polk Award recipients
American documentary film producers
American women documentary filmmakers